USS Caledonia (AK-167) was an  commissioned by the U.S. Navy for service in World War II. She was responsible for delivering troops, goods and equipment to locations in the war zone.

Construction
The second ship to be named Caledonia by the US Navy, was launched 1 January 1945 by Kaiser Cargo, Inc., Richmond, California, under a Maritime Commission contract, MC hull 2112; sponsored by Mrs. V. Brown; acquired by the Navy 13 March 1945; commissioned the same day and reported to the U.S. Pacific Fleet.

Service history

World War II Pacific Theatre operations
Assigned to a role in the Navy's gigantic logistic task of supplying military forces in the Pacific while still carrying out naval, air, and amphibious warfare, Caledonia sailed from San Francisco, California, 1 May 1945, laden with cargo for the base at Manus, where she began discharging 23 May. The cargo ship completed offloading at Samar, Philippine Islands, on 22 June, then steamed to Darwin, Australia, and Milne Bay, New Guinea, to reload supplies essentially needed in the Philippines. After offloading at Samar and Subic Bay in August and September, Caledonia made another voyage to Noumea, New Caledonia, for cargo, returning to Samar, from which she cleared 30 December for Baltimore, Maryland.

Post-war decommissioning
Caledonia was decommissioned there 25 March 1946, and was returned to the Maritime Commission four days later.

Merchant service
In 1947 Caledonia was sold to Bucha Godager & Co., Oslo, Norway. She was renamed Norse Captain.

In 1962 she was sold to the Philippine President Lines Inc., Manila, the Philippines. She was renamed Mabini in 1962 and then President Quezon in 1964.

In 1965 she was again sold, this time to the Seven Brothers Shipping Corp., Manila. She was again renamed, for the last time, Seven Kings. In 1980 she arrived in September at Kaohsiung, Taiwan for demolition by Li Chong Co. Ltd.

Notes 

Citations

Bibliography 

Online resources

External links
 

 

Alamosa-class cargo ships
Caledonia County, Vermont
Ships built in Richmond, California
1944 ships
World War II auxiliary ships of the United States